"Peace Train" is a 1971 song by Cat Stevens, taken from his album Teaser and the Firecat. The song climbed to No. 7 on the Billboard Hot 100 chart during the week of November 6, 1971, becoming Stevens' first US Top 10 hit. The song also spent three weeks at No. 1 on the adult contemporary chart. It is also featured on The Very Best of Cat Stevens compilation album. He re-recorded the song for the charity War Child in 2003.

History
In a 1970s concert he introduced the song with the revelation that he wrote the song whilst on a train, and was thinking about Alfred Hitchcock, no doubt reflecting the fact that many of Alfred Hitchcock's film plots were set on trains.

Cat Stevens later converted to Islam, changed his name to Yusuf Islam, and reduced his public appearances, but during the Iraq War he commented on the song's renewed relevance, saying: Peace Train' is a song I wrote, the message of which continues to breeze thunderously through the hearts of millions. There is a powerful need for people to feel that gust of hope rise up again. As a member of humanity and as a Muslim, this is my contribution to the call for a peaceful solution."

Yusuf Islam performed the song live at the 2006 Nobel Peace Prize Concert ceremony when Muhammad Yunus of Bangladesh received the award. The interlude during the song where the background singers chant "Kumbayaba" was removed for this version. He also performed the song as part of a comedic skit at Jon Stewart's Rally to Restore Sanity, and at the New Zealand national remembrance service for the Christchurch mosque shootings, held at Hagley Park on 29 March 2019.

Teaming up with Playing for Change, in 2021 Yusuf/Cat Stevens recorded a new version of "Peace Train" with over 25 musicians from 12 countries.

Allegations of hypocrisy
Pop songs with messages of peace were common in the Vietnam War era, and "Peace Train" was preceded by "Give Peace a Chance" in 1969. Not everyone found Cat Stevens's peace-themed song convincing, however. Robert Christgau criticized "Peace Train's" message in his November 1972 Newsday review of a concert by Stevens at the New York Philharmonic Hall: "I don't mind when Johnny Nash sings a charming ditty about how things are getting better, but when Stevens informs the world that we're all on a peace train, I get annoyed. We're not, and if Stevens ever stops shaking his head long enough to see clearly for a second, he might realize it."

After Ayatollah Khomeini announced a fatwa upon Salman Rushdie after the publication of the author's book The Satanic Verses, Stevens made statements supporting the fatwa, saying: Rushdie deserved to die; that he (Stevens) would act as executioner "if we were in an Islamic state and I was ordered by a judge"; and when asked, "would you go to a demonstration where you knew that an effigy was going to be burned?", Stevens replied, "I would have hoped that it'd be the real thing". Islam's comments caused a backlash at the time. The pop group 10,000 Maniacs deleted the Cat Stevens song "Peace Train", which they had recorded for their 1987 In My Tribe album, from subsequent pressings of the album as a protest against Islam's remarks. Several US stations stopped playing Cat Stevens records. Radio talk show host Tom Leykis of KFI-AM in Los Angeles called for a mass burning of Cat Stevens' records, later changed to a mass steamrolling. Islam claimed that he had earlier unsuccessfully asked his record company to stop production of his Cat Stevens records but they had refused on economic grounds.

Following the terrorist attacks on 11 September 2001, the song was placed on the list of post-9/11 inappropriate titles distributed by Clear Channel.

Chart history

Weekly charts

Year-end charts

Cover versions
Aside from Stevens' original recording, a cover version of "Peace Train" was recorded by the American alternative rock band 10,000 Maniacs. The song originally appeared on the band's 1987 album, In My Tribe, but it failed to chart.  After Stevens' comment which some interpreted as calling for the death of Salman Rushdie, 10,000 Maniacs lead singer Natalie Merchant had "Peace Train" removed from all future pressings of the album in the U.S.

In 1995, a cover of "Peace Train" was included on the Don Williams CD Borrowed Tales. In 1996, Dolly Parton included a version of "Peace Train", accompanied by South African vocal group Ladysmith Black Mambazo, on her album of covers Treasures. Parton produced a CBS television special, airing in November 1996, to promote the album, in which she described "Peace Train" as a personal favorite. The special also included a brief interview of Yusuf Islam, describing how he came to write the song.  (Islam later joined Parton on a cover of another of his songs, "Where Do the Children Play?", playing guitar on the track for her 2005 album Those Were the Days). In 1997, Parton released the song as a single and filmed a music video, directed by Christopher Ciccone, brother of entertainer Madonna. The single was a hit on the US Dance chart peaking at No. 23.

The song has also been covered by Tony Meléndez in 1987, Jann Arden in 2007, Zain Bhikha in 2008, Laleh, Richie Havens, Melanie, Sam Harris, and Rob Tobias and Friends. The song was also remixed by the DJ Junior Vasquez.

The song has appeared in the films The War, Remember the Titans, Ordinary Magic, We Are Marshall, and Jobs. Richie Havens's cover was included in the soundtrack of The Wonder Years TV series.

More recently, "Peace Train" (along with several other Cat Stevens songs) appeared in the 2015 American comedy Rock the Kasbah.

See also
 List of anti-war songs
 List of number-one adult contemporary singles of 1971 (U.S.)

References

10,000 Maniacs songs
1970 songs
1971 singles
A&M Records singles
Peace songs
Anti-war songs
Cat Stevens songs
Dolly Parton songs
Island Records singles
Song recordings produced by Paul Samwell-Smith
Songs about trains
Songs written by Cat Stevens